David Matza (May 1, 1930 – March 14, 2018) was an American sociologist who taught at University of California, Berkeley from 1961.

Life and Work 
Born in New York, he received his PhD from Princeton University in 1959. His research fields included deviant behavior, social change, poverty and working class life. He is best known for coauthoring, with Gresham Sykes, techniques of neutralization.

References

1930 births
2018 deaths
American criminologists
Princeton University alumni
University of California, Berkeley faculty